Ripun Bora (born 1 October 1955) is an Indian politician and leader of the All India Trinamool Congress party from Assam since 2022. He is serving as President of the Assam Trinamool Congress since 2022. He was the President of  Assam Pradesh Congress Committee from 2016 to 2021,Memeber of Rajya Sabha for Assam from 2016 to 2022. Bora also served as the Minister of  Education,Government of Assam.He is a member of the Indian National Congress till 2022.

Controversy
On 21 September 2020, Ripun Bora along with seven other members were suspended from the Rajya Sabha for their unruly behaviour in the house by tearing documents, breaking mics and heckling the Deputy Chairman of the Rajya Sabha. Their actions were condemned by several leaders.

On 3 June 2008 then Education Minister of Assam, Ripun Bora was arrested in Delhi for offering and paying bribe of Rs 10 lakh to a CBI official, who was investigating the murder of Daniel Topno which happened on September 27, 2000.

Bora was one of the accused in the murder case. Topno, who was the District President of All Assam Tea Tribe Students Union, was Bora's political rival during 1996 Assam Assembly Election. The case was handed over to CBI in 2001 after Assam Police failed to make any progress.

Although, in 2014 Kamrup Metro Session Court acquitted Bora, CBI filed a criminal revision petition in Guwahati High Court and the case was registered on 3 June. No hearing has taken place on the matter since 2014.

References 

Indian National Congress politicians from Assam
Rajya Sabha members from Assam
Living people
Assam MLAs 2016–2021
State cabinet ministers of Assam
1955 births